USS James E. Williams (DDG-95) is an  in the United States Navy. The ship was named for Boatswain's mate Petty officer first class James Eliott Williams (1930–1999), a River Patrol Boat commander and Medal of Honor recipient from the Vietnam War who is considered to be the most decorated enlisted man in Navy history.  As of July 2020 the ship is part of Destroyer Squadron 26 based out of Naval Station Norfolk.

Construction
USS James E. Williams was laid down on 15 July 2002 by the Northrop Grumman Ship Systems at Ingalls Shipbuilding in Pascagoula, Mississippi and launched on 25 June 2003, sponsored by Elaine Weaver Williams, Chief Petty Officer Williams' widow. On 11 December 2004, James E. Williams was commissioned in Charleston, South Carolina, Commander Philip Warren Vance in command.

Service history
On 2 May 2006, James E. Williams deployed on its maiden deployment as part of the Global War on Terrorism Surface Strike Group (GWOT SSG) 06-2. James E. Williams, along with the amphibious transport dock  and guided-missile cruiser , joined the Global War on Terrorism Surface Strike Group (GWOT SSG) 06-2 overseas on 18 April. On 17 October 2006, James E. Williams completed its first deployment conducting anti-piracy operations off the coast of Somalia as part of the maritime security operations.

James E. Williams deployed again on 9 July 2007 as a part of the  Carrier Strike Group. On the morning of 30 October 2007, Combined Maritime Forces Headquarters, in Bahrain, received a call from the International Maritime Bureau, located in Kuala Lumpur, Malaysia, providing the status of the North Korean cargo vessel Dai Hong Dan, which had been taken over 29 October by Somali pirates. The destroyer arrived in the vicinity of the Korean ship midday local time and contacted the pirates via bridge-to-bridge radio, ordering them to give up their weapons. At that point, the Korean crew had confronted the Somali pirates, regained control of the ship and began communicating with James E. Williams, requesting medical assistance. The crew said the pirates had been in control of the bridge, but the crew had retained control of the steering and engineering spaces. The crew of James E. Williams provided care and assistance for approximately 12 hours to crew members and Somali pirates aboard Dai Hong Dan. Six pirates were captured and one was killed. The pirates remained aboard Dai Hong Dan. In November 2007, James E. Williams aided the crew of the Taiwanese ship, M/V Ching Fong Hwa 168. After the Somali pirates returned to shore, the destroyer escorted the Taiwanese ship out of Somali waters and provided needed supplies and medical assistance.

On 19 December 2007, she returned from her second deployment to the Fifth Fleet AOR in support of Operations Iraqi and Enduring Freedom.

On 20 April 2009, James E. Williams left on her 3rd deployment in 3 years, deploying to the sixth and fifth Fleet areas of operations from Naval Station Norfolk as the lead element of the Bataan Amphibious Ready Group. James E. Williams conducted maritime security operations in the Mediterranean Sea and Persian Gulf regions, including working with other nations' maritime forces. She returned to her homeport at Naval Station Norfolk on 19 October 2009.

On the evening of 8 August 2012,  rescued ten mariners from a burning Iranian-flagged dhow (pictured) while operating in the Gulf of Oman. Of the ten mariners, eight were identified as Iranians and two were Pakistanis. The rescued mariners received medical treatment and transport to the carrier Enterprise before being repatriated back to Iran on 10 August. James E. Williams reentered the Mediterranean Sea on 25 August.

Controversies

In December 2009,  months after the ship returned to Norfolk from a six-month cruise to the Mediterranean and Arabian seas, nine crewmembers were given non-judicial punishment for fraternization. Five of the nine were male chief petty officers while the other four were female junior enlisted sailors. The chiefs involved were being processed for separation from the Navy. In addition, the ship's skipper, Commander Paul Marquis, and top enlisted sailor, Command Master Chief Timothy Youell, were relieved of their positions and reassigned to shore-based administrative duties. Neither Marquis nor Youell were implicated in the fraternization cases or alleged sexual assault but were removed due to a loss of confidence in their leadership. Furthermore, one other crew member faced criminal charges for sexual assault. Marquis' executive officer, CDR Daniel Sunvold, who was serving as executive officer on James E. Williams, was reassigned to the same position on the destroyer . He was not implicated in any of the allegations. In December 2009 CDR T.J. Linardi took command as commanding officer.
In September 2014, it was announced the commanding officer, CDR Curtis Calloway, and command master chief of James E. Williams were replaced pending an investigation into the command climate. At the time, James E. Williams was about midway through an eight-month deployment. At that time, CAPT Anthony L. Simmons, from the staff of Destroyer Squadron (DESRON) 2, assumed command.

Ports visited

During the 2014-2015 Deployment, James E. Williams made port calls to Rota, Spain; Djibouti, Djibouti; Port Victoria, Seychelles; and Port Louis, Mauritius.

On 3 August 2017, the boat visited Trondheim Seilforening in Trondheim, Norway. People lined up to see the great ship.

On 29 November 2017 the boat visited Odesa port in Odesa, Ukraine.

During the 2017 Deployment, the ship visited Rotterdam, Netherlands; Kiel, Germany (as a part of Kiel Week); Reykjavik, Iceland; Rota, Spain; Trondheim, Norway; Bergen, Norway; Riga, Latvia; Lisbon, Portugal; Souda Bay, Greece; Manama, Bahrain; Jeddah, Saudi Arabia; and Odessa, Ukraine prior to returning to Norfolk, VA on 23 December 2017. The ship's crew also earned their Blue Nose for crossing into the Arctic Circle.

USS James E. Williams and ARC Antioquia conducted a passing exercise in the Caribbean Sea on 15 February 2021.

Awards
 Navy Unit Commendation - (Jul-Dec 2007, Jan-Aug 2020)
 Navy Meritorious Unit Commendation - (Jan 2011-Nov 2012)
 Navy E Ribbon - (2011)

Gallery

References

External links 
 
  USS James E. Williams official website
navsource.org: USS James E. Williams

  navysite.de: USS James E. Williams

 

Arleigh Burke-class destroyers
Destroyers of the United States
Ships built in Pascagoula, Mississippi
2003 ships